MS Trelleborg has been the name of two vessels:

  was a ship built in 1958. MS Trelleborg was subsequently renamed Homerus, Nissos Kypros and Veesham IX before being scrapped in 2003.
  is a ferry built in 1981 that travels between Trelleborg and Sassnitz (Mukran) for Scandlines. Its home port is Trelleborg, the city that inspired the name of the vessel.

Ship names